Thomas Johns may refer to:

 Thomas Johnes (priest) (1749–1826), Archdeacon of Barnstaple
 Thomas Johns (minister) (1836–1914), Welsh Independent (Congregationalist) minister

See also
 Thomas Johnes (disambiguation)